{{DISPLAYTITLE:C9H9NO3}}
The molecular formula C9H9NO3 (molar mass: 179.175 g/mol) may refer to:

 Acedoben
 N-Acetylanthranilic acid
 Adrenochrome
 Hippuric acid

Molecular formulas